Essex North Shore Agricultural and Technical School (ENSATS) is an agricultural and technical high school located in Hathorne section of Danvers, Massachusetts, United States. Opening in September 2014, Essex Technical High School succeeded North Shore Technical High School in Middleton, Massachusetts, Essex Agricultural High School in Danvers, Massachusetts, and the vocational programs at Peabody Veterans Memorial High School.

History
Essex Aggie was founded in 1913 on land the County of Essex purchased and established the "Essex Agricultural School". The farm was called Maplewood. At one time land was owned by John Putnam, son of the emigrant. Since then it has expanded. In 2014, it merged with North Shore Technical High School and took the CTE programs from Peabody Veterans Memorial High School due to financial issues, and so they could expand by having more up to date and refined facilities and working areas. The new school was known as Essex Technical High School. On Thursday, March 15, 2018, the School Committee voted to change the name of the school from Essex Technical High School to Essex North Shore Agricultural and Technical School (ENSATS). The decision was made after many key stakeholders weighed in; including parents, students, state representatives, and other community members.

Curriculum

Academics
Academic classes meet every other five-day "cycle".  Each year, students have six core academic classes which meet for an hour each, including English, mathematics, history, science, Spanish (alternative options offered for some students). The sixth class, for upper classmen, is a theory class relating to their shop, and pathways for freshmen and sophomores.

Career technical education 
CTE classes or “shops” meet every other five-day “cycle”. 

Students can choose from 24 shops, them being:
Advanced Manufacturing, Automotive Technology, Automotive Collision Repair & Refinishing, Arboriculture,  Biotechnology, Companion Animals, Carpentry, Construction Craft Laborers, Cosmetology, Culinary Arts, Design & Media, Dental Assisting, Engineering & Automatic Technology, Equine Science, Electricity, Information Technology Services, Landscape & Turf Management, Health Assisting, HVAC, Masonry & Tile Setting, Plumbing, Natural & Environmental Sciences, Sustainable Horticulture, and Veterinary Science. 

Out of district students can only choose from the seven agricultural programs: Veterinary Science, Sustainable Horticulture, Natural & Environmental Sciences, Landscape & Turf Management, Companion Animals, and Equine Science.

During freshman year, students go through one cycle of Career Discovery where get to see every shop. The following cycle, students pick 12 shops they would like to explore further in order of how much they want to explore them. They get seven shops to explore and each CTE cycle for the next seven weeks they explore a different shop (out of district students explore the seven agricultural programs). In January they choose their final CTE program.

Students have physical education or health education during their shop weeks.

Nighthawks adult education
ENSATS offers adult education courses after school hours.

Athletics

Essex North Shore Agricultural and Technical school offers many different sports for students to compete in. For boys, there is cross country, football, soccer, and golf in the fall sports season. In the winter sports season, there is indoor track, wrestling (with Masco), hockey, and basketball. Lastly, for the spring season, there is baseball, lacrosse, spring track, and volleyball.

For girls, there is cross country, field hockey (with Georgetown), volleyball, soccer, and cheerleading offered in the fall. In the winter, there is basketball, indoor track, hockey (with Fenwick), and winter cheerleading. Lastly, in the spring, there is softball, spring track, and lacrosse.

The school also offers co-ed sports, such as gymnastics, swimming & diving (with Peabody), indoor track, strength and conditioning, and athletic training.

As of fall 2023, The school's athletic teams, known as the Essex Tech Hawks, compete in the Cape Ann League of the Massachusetts Interscholastic Athletic Association.

References

External links
Essex Technical High School
Essex Aggie Alumni Page
Essex Aggie Alumni Facebook Page

Agricultural schools
Educational institutions established in 1913
Schools in Essex County, Massachusetts
Public high schools in Massachusetts
1913 establishments in Massachusetts